Luciano Castillo (born December 6, 1965 in Puerto Rico) is an engineer known for his work in theoretical and experimental fluid dynamics, turbulence and wind energyand for applying scaling analysis and asymptotic methods. He is currently the Kenninger Chair Professor of Renewable Energy and Power Systems in the School of Mechanical Engineering at Purdue University, West Lafayette, Indiana, where he is also the Dean’s Faculty Fellow for Hispanic/Latino Engagement, Purdue University, (2019–present).

Education
Luciano Castillo started his career at University of Puerto Rico at Mayagüez and transferred to the State University of New York at Buffalo (SUNY) where he earned his bachelor's degree (1990) and doctorate (1997) in mechanical engineering.

Career
In 1999, Castillo joined the faculty at Rensselaer Polytechnic Institute, Troy, New York as an assistant professor. In 2011, he joined Texas Tech University as Don-Kay-Clay Cash Distinguished Engineering Chair in Wind Energy and was also appointed as president of the National Wind Resource Center in Lubbock, Texas. in 2017, Castillo moved to Purdue University as the Kenninger Professor of Renewable Energy and Power Systems.

Honors and awards (selected) 
 National Academy of Engineering of Mexico, Foreign Corresponding Member  (2020)
 Associate Fellow, American Institute of Aeronautics and Astronautics (AIAA)  (2020).
 Fellow American Physical Society (APS), (2019).
 Fellow American Society of Mechanical Engineers (ASME), (2013).

Selected publications

References

1965 births
Living people
Fellows of the American Society of Mechanical Engineers
Fellows of the American Physical Society
University at Buffalo alumni
University of Puerto Rico alumni
Rensselaer Polytechnic Institute faculty
Texas Tech University faculty
Purdue University faculty